Phorticus is a genus of damsel bugs in the family Nabidae. There are about eight described species in Phorticus.

Species
These eight species belong to the genus Phorticus:
 Phorticus affinis Poppius, 1915
 Phorticus collaris Stål, 1873 (collared nabid)
 Phorticus formosanus Poppius, 1915
 Phorticus socialis Harris
 Phorticus speciosus Harris
 Phorticus variegatus Harris
 Phorticus velutinus Puton, 1895
 Phorticus viduus Stål, 1860

References

Further reading

 
 

Nabidae
Articles created by Qbugbot